California's 24th State Assembly district is one of 80 California State Assembly districts. It is currently represented by Democrat Marc Berman of Palo Alto.

District profile 
The district straddles the transition from San Francisco Peninsula suburbia into Silicon Valley. It is home to numerous notable high-tech companies and affluent residential communities.

San Mateo County – 17.5%
 Atherton
 East Palo Alto
 Half Moon Bay
 Menlo Park
 Portola Valley
 Woodside

Santa Clara County – 19.0%
 Cupertino – 7.7%
 Los Altos
 Los Altos Hills
 Mountain View
 Palo Alto
 Sunnyvale

Election results from statewide races

List of Assembly Members 
Due to redistricting, the 24th district has been moved around different parts of the state. The current iteration resulted from the 2011 redistricting by the California Citizens Redistricting Commission.

Election results 1992 - present

2020

2018

2016

2014

2012

2010

2008

2006

2004

2002

2000

1998

1996

1994

1992

See also 
 California State Assembly
 California State Assembly districts
 Districts in California

References

External links 
 District map from the California Citizens Redistricting Commission

24
Government of San Mateo County, California
Government of Santa Clara County, California
Cupertino, California
Half Moon Bay, California
Los Altos, California
Mountain View, California
Pacifica, California
Palo Alto, California
Redwood City, California
Sunnyvale, California
Government in the San Francisco Bay Area